Herrera del Duque is a municipality located in the province of Badajoz, Extremadura, Spain. , the municipality has a population of 3681  inhabitants.

The town is commanded by a 15th-16th-century fortress-castle. Other sights include the church of St. John the Baptist and the hermitage of Nuestra Señora de Consolación.

Villages
The municipality includes the village of Peloche, located at 8 km from the town, with a population of 235 inhabitants according to the 2009 census.

Sights

References

External links
Official website

Municipalities in the Province of Badajoz